Endotricha costaemaculalis is a species of snout moth in the genus Endotricha. It was described by Hugo Theodor Christoph in 1881, and is known from China, Korea, Japan, Taiwan, India and Russia.

Subspecies
Endotricha costaemaculalis costaemaculalis (south-eastern Siberia, Korea, Japan, China: Guangdong, Hebei, Henan, Hubei, Zhejiang)
Endotricha costaemaculalis formosensis Hampson, 1916 (Taiwan)
Endotricha costaemaculalis fuscifusalis Hampson, 1896 (northern India, southern Tibet, southern China)

References

Moths described in 1881
Endotrichini
Moths of Japan